The Dey Street Passageway or Dey Street Concourse is a  underground passageway in Manhattan, New York City, built as part of the Fulton Center project to rehabilitate the Fulton Street station complex and improve connectivity in Lower Manhattan. The Dey Street Passageway lies under Dey Street in Lower Manhattan, between Broadway in the eastern end, and Church Street in its western end.

Concept

During the planning stage of the Fulton Center project, there were numerous alternatives for a passageway connecting Church Street and the Fulton Street complex. These alternatives included a pedestrian tunnel, with a paid transfer, under Fulton Street. Various configurations within the Fulton Center main building were also planned, including a diagonal link between a tunnel under Dey Street and the  mezzanine in the Fulton Center transit hub.

The MTA's decision to disallow a paid transfer was on the premise that Broadway and Church Streets are critical north–south streets. An unpaid passageway allows non-passengers to move throughout Lower Manhattan without having to cross those streets. Furthermore, the passageway directly connects to the World Trade Center Transportation Hub, the connection to which opened in the World Trade Center site in May 2016. It also connects to the other World Trade Center buildings, as well as a new passageway to the World Financial Center.

The aforementioned transfer between the Cortlandt Street and Chambers Street-World Trade Center stations was eventually realized and opened in late 2017.

Construction

The contract for the construction of the passageway was given on July 29, 2005 to Slattery Skanska. Construction began in 2005, with the closure of the Cortlandt Street station on the BMT Broadway line, which closed on August 20, 2005 and Dey Street proper. Cut and cover construction was used to construct the tunnel. A building at the corner of Dey Street and Broadway was demolished on January 29, 2007, to allow the creation for a head house or entrance for the new facility.

It will link the exit in the middle of the IRT Lexington Avenue Line platforms of the Fulton Street complex with the World Trade Center Transportation Hub.

With the conclusion of cut and cover construction, Dey Street reopened to traffic on November 24, 2008. The uptown platform of the Cortlandt Street station reopened on November 25, 2009. Fit-out work of much of the Dey Street Passageway, including the placement of floor and wall tiles, is underway as of August 5, 2012.

This permitted the reopening of the southbound platform, which does not have street-level access on the western side of Church Street. A white false wall separated the opened underpass with the rest of the passageway. A progress presentation from the MTA in June 2012 had suggested that there will be fare control at the underpass/passageway level, along with elevator access.

The headhouse was originally expected to open on July 31, 2012, but opened on October 8, 2012. Currently, it serves as an entrance for the southbound , and as the main access point for the Dey Street Passageway, which opened on November 10, 2014, ahead of schedule. The connection to the World Trade Center hub opened on May 26, 2016.

Notes

References

External links

MTA Fulton Street Transit Center page
Lower Manhattan: Hollowing Out the Dey Street Concourse
 Headhouse from Google Maps Street View
 Interior from Google Maps Street View

Transportation projects in New York City
New York City Subway infrastructure